J. Andrew Noel, Jr. is an American sports administrator.

References

External links
 Cornell profile

Year of birth missing (living people)
Living people
Cornell Big Red athletic directors
Cornell Big Red wrestling coaches
Colgate University alumni
Franklin & Marshall College alumni